Antarmanko Yatra is a autobiography written by Jagadish Ghimire. This book won the Madan Puraskar in 2064  B.S. (2007).

See also 

 Khusi
 Khalangama Hamala
 Yaar
 Chhuteka Anuhar

References

2007 non-fiction books
Nepali-language books
Madan Puraskar-winning works
21st-century Nepalese books
Nepalese biographies
Nepalese non-fiction books
Nepalese non-fiction literature
Nepalese autobiographies